Palaihnihan (also Palaihnih) is a language family of northeastern California. It consists of two closely related languages, both now extinct:

 Atsugewi (†) 
 Achumawi (†) (ís siwa wó disi, also known as Achomawi, Pit River Indian)

Reconstruction
The original reconstruction of proto-Palaihnihan suffered from poor quality data. David Olmsted's dictionary depends almost entirely upon de Angulo, who did not record the phonological distinctions consistently or well, and carelessly includes Pomo vocabulary from a manuscript in which he (de Angulo) set out to demonstrate that Achumawi and Pomo are not related. William Bright has also pointed out problems with Olmsted's methods of reconstruction.  The reconstruction is being refined with newer data.

Good, McFarland, & Paster (2003) conclude there were at least three vowels, *a *i *u, and possibly marginal *e, along with vowel length and ablaut. Consonants were as follows:

Genetic relations
The Palaihnihan family is often connected with the hypothetical Hokan stock. Proposed special relationships within Hokan include Palaihnihan with Shastan (known as Shasta-Achomawi) and within a Kahi sub-group (also known as Northern Hokan) with Shastan, Chimariko, and Karuk.

References

Bibliography

 
 Good, Jeff; McFarland, Teresa; & Paster, Mary. (2003). Reconstructing Achumawi and Atsugewi: Proto-Palaihnihan revisited. Atlanta, GA. (Paper presented at the annual meeting of the Society for the Study of the Indigenous Languages of the Americas, January 2–5).
 Mithun, Marianne. (1999). The languages of Native North America. Cambridge: Cambridge University Press.  (hbk); .
 Nevin, Bruce E. (1991). "Obsolescence in Achumawi: Why Uldall Too?". Papers from the American Indian Languages Conferences, held at the University of California, Santa Cruz, July and August 1991. Occasional Papers on Linguistics 16:97-127. Department of Linguistics, Southern Illinois University at Carbondale.
 Nevin, Bruce E. (1998). Aspects of Pit River phonology. Ph.D. dissertation, University of Pennsylvania.
 
 
 
 
 Olmsted, David L. (1958). Atsugewi Phonology, International Journal of American Linguistics, Vol. 24, No. 3, Franz Boas Centennial, Volume (Jul., 1958), pp. 215–220.
 Olmsted, David L. (1964). A history of Palaihnihan phonology. University of California publications in linguistics (Vol. 35). Berkeley: University of California Press.

 
Language families